Golaghat district (Pron:ˌgəʊləˈgɑ:t) is an administrative district in the state of Assam in India. It attained district status in 1987. The district headquarters are located at Golaghat.

Etymology
The name 'Golaghat' originated from the markets established by a business class of people called Marwari during the middle of 19th century at the bank of the river Dhansiri in the vicinity of the district headquarters. "Gola" means market and "Ghat" means the port of river transport.

History 

Inscription on rocks of Nagajari Khanikar village of Sarupathar, remnants of fortifications, brick structures, monuments, temples, tanks, etc. are evidence of a 9th-century kingdom in the Doyang-Dhansiri valley. The Ahoms were the rulers of the Doyang-Dhansiri valley in the 16th century. Earlier, this part was ruled by the Kacharis. The Kacharis were pushed back towards west of the Karbi hills. The Ahom King appointed a ruler entitled 'Morongi-Khowa Gohain', an administrative post with the Rank of a Governor/Minister of the Ahom administration. Under Morongi-Khowa Gohain, large number of people from different parts of Ahom kingdom were settled in erstwhile Kachari Kingdom. An interesting aspect of such settlement was that a large number of people from different castes/communities were mixed up together so that there was remote chance of rebellion in such newly acquired territory. Most of the Morongi-Khowa Gohains were appointed from the Burhagohain families although there were few exceptions.

Later, when the British took control of Assam, the Doyang-Dhansiri valley was incorporated under the newly formed Golaghat subdivision of the Sibsagar district in 1846. Golaghat district played an active part in the freedom struggle of India. Kushal Konwar, Kamala Miri, Dwariki Das, Biju Vaishnav, Sankar Chandra Barua, Shri Tara Prasad Barooah, Rajendra Nath Barua, Gaurilal Jain, Ganga Ram Bormedhi and Dwarikanath Goswami are eminent freedom fighters of the region.

Golaghat was raised to the position of a district of Assam on 15 August 1987, when it was split from Sibsagar district.

Geography 

Location 
Golaghat district is surrounded by the river Brahmaputra to the north, the state of Nagaland to the south, Jorhat district to the east and Karbi Anglong and Nagaon district to the west. Dhansiri is the principal river, which originates from Laisang peak of Nagaland. It streams through a distance of 352 km from south to north before joining the Brahmaputra. Doyang, Nambor, Doigrung and Kalioni are the four rivulets of the Dhansiri. The river Kakodonga marks the border between Golaghat and Jorhat districts.

National protected area
Kaziranga National Park (Part)
Nambor - Doigrung Wildlife Sanctuary

Climate 
The climate is tropical with a hot and humid weather prevailing most of the summer and monsoon months. Total average annual rainfall is 1300 mm. Maximum precipitation occurs in June and July. Maximum temperature is 38.0 °C in June and minimum temperature is 8.0 °C in December.

Divisions
There are four Assam Legislative Assembly constituencies in this district: Bokakhat, Sarupathar, Golaghat, and Khumtai. All four are in the Kaliabor Lok Sabha constituency.

Administration 
Within the merged establishment of the Deputy Commissioner, Golaghat are the Offices of the Sub-Divisional Officers, Dhansiri and Bokakhat. There are multiple functions and issues looked after by the Deputy Commissioner's office from its headquarters. The branches of the Office of the Deputy Commissioner are rationalized as Administration, Civil Defence, Confidential, Development, Election, Excise, Home Guards, Magisterial, Nazarat, Personnel, Registration, Revenue, Supply, Treasury and Zila Sainik Board. The Courts of District and Session Judge are also located in its headquarters at Golaghat.

Demographics 
According to the 2011 census Golaghat district has a population of 1,066,888, roughly equal to the nation of Cyprus or the US state of Rhode Island. This gives it a ranking of 430th in India (out of a total of 640). Its population growth rate over the decade 2001-2011 was 11.88%. Golaghat has a sex ratio of 961 females for every 1000 males, and a literacy rate of 78.31%. Scheduled Castes and Scheduled Tribes make up 5.84% and 10.48% of the population respectively.

Religion

Hinduism is followed by majority of the people in Golaghat district: 85.99%. Muslims form 8.46% of population. while Christians are 4.74% of the population.

Languages 

According to the 2011 census, 78.40% of the population speak Assamese, 4.59% Bengali, 2.71% Mising, 2.50% Nepali, 1.86% Boro, 1.79% Hindi, 1.52% Sadri and 1.36% Odia as their first language.

Territorial dispute 

Around  of Golaghat district is under occupation by the state of Nagaland (Merapani region). There were major conflicts between the two sides in 1979 and 1985, with 54 and 41 deaths respectively. Almost all the deaths were from the Assamese side and the attackers included NSCN militants and Nagaland police.

Culture 

Golaghat district crowns many literary intellects who have made outstanding contributions to Assamese literature. The most prominent writer of the 19th century who hailed from Golaghat was Hem Chandra Barua, the writer of first Assamese dictionary Hemkosh. Raghunath Mahanta, Satradhikar of Doyang Alengi Satra of Golaghat, was another writer of 19th century who composed three masterpieces, namely Shatrunjoy Kavya, Adbhoot Ramayan and Katha Ramayan. One significant poet of the Ahom age was Durgeswar Dwiji. He composed a book titled Sangkhosur Badh. Hem Chandra Goswami is regarded as one of the most exceptional writers of the late 19th century and early twentieth century. He is the first sonnet writer of Assamese language. The credit of first Assamese poetess plus first Assamese short story writer amongst women went to Yamuneswari Khatoniar of Golaghat. Her collection of verses called Arun was the first book written by a woman poet.

Raibahadur Ghanashyam Barua of Golaghat, who was also famous in the field of politics as the first Central Minister of Assam, translated William Shakespeare's The Comedy of Errors into the Assamese language along with three of his partners. Kamal Chandra Sarma of Golaghat enjoyed the influential position of secretary of 'Asomiya Bhasa Unnoti Sadhini Sabha'. Syed Abdul Malik, the invincible writer of Assamese literature, belongs to the village of Nahoroni in Golaghat. He was the president of Assam Sahitya Sabha. Malik received many exalted prizes, including Sahitya Akademy, Sankar Dev Award, Xahityacharyya, etc.

Other people from Golaghat who marked their names as great writers of Assamese literature include Surendranath Saikia, Hari Parsad Barua, Kirtinath Hazarika, Dr Nagen Saikia, Dr Debo Prasad Barooah, Nilamoni Phukan, Samir Tanti, Lakhikanta Mahanta, Purna Chandra Goswami, Dr Upen Kakoty, Lolit Barua, Golap Khound and Premadhar Dutta. The Golaghat Sahitya Sabha is one of the oldest congresses of Assam Sahitya Sabha, started in 1918.

Flora and fauna
It shares the park with Nagaon district. It also home to Nambor - Doigrung Wildlife Sanctuary.

Notable people
Manoj Gogoi, animal rescuer at Kaziranga National Park
Lovlina Borgohain, Indian Boxer (Olympic medalist).

References

External links 
 www.mygolaghat.com A Website on golaghat
 
 A Website on Kaziranga Wildlife Park

 
1987 establishments in Assam
Districts of Assam